The Volkswagen Virtus is a subcompact sedan (B-segment) manufactured by the German automaker Volkswagen since 2018. It is based on the Polo Mk6 with an extended wheelbase and the same Volkswagen Group MQB A0 platform, which it also closely shares with the Taigo/Nivus and T-Cross/Taigun.

It was first introduced in Brazil in November 2017, with sales starting in January 2018. From Brazil, the vehicle has been exported throughout Latin America. In March 2022, the vehicle was introduced in India to replace the Vento and uses the MQB A0 IN platform adapted for India.

A redesigned version has been sold as the Škoda Slavia in India, which was introduced in November 2021 and went on sale in February 2022. The Virtus is also marketed as the Volkswagen Polo Sedan in South Africa since September 2022.

Markets

Brazil 
The Virtus was introduced in Brazil on 16 November 2017 as a sedan counterpart to the Polo, and slots between the smaller Voyage and the larger Jetta in VW Brazil sedan line-up. It uses the same front fascia as the Polo, including the modifications that were made to the Polo for the South American market such as redesigned bumper. The trunk has a capacity of 521 litre, an increase of 200 litre from the Polo.

In Brazil, all Virtus versions are sold as flex-fuel vehicles (petrol and ethanol). The rest of the options are all equipped with the TSI engines, with 1.0-litre ( gasoline,  ethanol), and 1.4-litre ( with both fuels), the latter only available for the GTS version.

In February 2023, Virtus sold in Brazil received a restyling, which brought updates to the model. The GTS version was discontinued, being replaced by a version called Exclusive which is powered with the 1.4-litre TSI engine ( with both fuels). In addition, the basic versions are powered by the 170 TSI 1.0-litre engine ( gasoline,  ethanol) which replaced the base 1.6-litre MSI four-cylinder engine. The mid-range versions, Comfortline and Highline retains the 200 TSI 1.0 litre engine, with 1.0-litre ( gasoline,  ethanol).

Powertrain

Argentina 
The Virtus was released in Argentina in February 2018 with a sole 1.6-litre MSI engine with 6-speed automatic transmission.

Mexico 
During its initial release, the model was imported from Brazil and placed between the Indian-made Vento and the Jetta.

In September 2022, the updated Virtus was released for the 2023 model year. It is imported from India, while the Vento was discontinued. An optional 1.0-litre TSI engine was introduced alongside the older 1.6-litre engine.

India 
The Virtus was introduced in India on 8 March 2022 as a replacement to the Vento and the sister model of the Škoda Slavia. It was launched with the facelifted appearance, differentiated with the Polo and with a revised dashboard design. The Indian version is localized with up to 95% of its parts. As with the Taigun, Škoda Kushaq and Škoda Slavia, it uses the MQB A0 IN platform, and will be exported to 25 countries.

The Virtus GT is the range-topping model which features cosmetic upgrades as compared to the Dynamic line such as dual-tone roof along with sunroof, red accents, red brake calipers and aluminum pedals similar to GTI models. Equipment list included ventilated front seats, wireless smartphone charging, an eight-inch digital instrument cluster, sunroof, and ambient lighting. Sales started in June 2022.

Powertrain

Safety

Latin America 
The made-in-Brazil Volkswagen Virtus was sold in Latin America with a standard safety specification of four airbags including two frontal airbags and two seat-mounted side combination torso-head airbags, i-Size approved ISOFIX anchorages, three-point seatbelts in all seats, front and rear seatbelt pretensioners. Electronic Stability Control and post-collision braking were sold in volumes high enough for Latin NCAP's five star rating.

The Virtus was tested by the New Car Assessment Programme for Latin America and the Caribbean (Latin NCAP) in 2017 and achieved five stars for both adult and child protection, performing well across all areas of assessment including the ESC test and side, front and pole impacts (the last two were carried over from the Polo based on technical evidence supplied by Volkswagen). The Virtus also received an award from Latin NCAP Advanced for its pedestrian protection.

In 2020, Latin NCAP introduced a geometric evaluation for head protection airbags for rear occupants; the updated Virtus for Latin America is equipped with curtain airbags instead of the older seat-mounted combination torso-head airbags, and is fitted with rear-seat belt reminders. Higher trim levels are also sold with Autonomous Emergency Braking, which is part of Latin NCAP's 2020 assessment protocols. Latin NCAP reassessed the facelifted Virtus against their new protocols in 2022, and it achieved the maximum five star safety rating.

India 
The Virtus is sold in India with a standard safety specification of two frontal airbags, i-Size approved ISOFIX anchorages, Electronic Stability Control, three-point seatbelts for all seats, front and rear seatbelt pretensioners, post-collision braking and a tyre pressure monitor. Higher trim levels are fitted with front-seat side torso airbags, and front and rear head-protecting curtains.

The Virtus has not been independently rated by the Global New Car Assessment Programme (Global NCAP).

Sales

References

External links 

 Official website (India)

Virtus
Cars introduced in 2017
2020s cars
Front-wheel-drive vehicles
Subcompact cars
Sedans
Latin NCAP superminis